The Régiment de la Sarre was a French Army regiment active in the 18th century.  It is principally known for its role in the Seven Years' War, when it served in the North American theatre.

History
The regiment was recruited in the French region of Lorraine. After recruitment, most of the regiment left from Brest, France aboard a few French ships, such as Le Héros and Le Léopard.  The last of the men would arrive in Quebec City on 31 May 1756. They took part in the capture of Fort Oswego in August of that same year, and then escorted the British prisoners to Montreal after the battle. Régiment de la Sarre played a key role in the victory at Fort Oswego losing 7 men in the process.   In August 1757, many soldiers of the regiment participated in the victory at Fort William Henry. At Fort William Henry, Régiment de la Sarre contributed 800-900 men of the roughly 5000 who fought in the battle itself. The fort capitulated before they had a chance to launch a full on assault on it. The regiment then served under Louis-Joseph de Montcalm in 1758 at the Battle of Carillon.This victory was absolutely decisive for the French crippling a much larger British force. Régiment de la Sarre also played a significant role in this battle. La Sarre was commanded by de Savournin during the battle. During the Battle, de la Sarre took up the left flank along with the Languedoc regiment. The regiment lost a number of captains during the battle and perhaps took the heaviest French losses during the bloodiest and largest French victory of the war in North America.  The regiment then participates in the battles of Montmorency, Plains of Abraham and Sainte-Foy. The Battle at Montmorency was another French victory in which Régiment de la Sarre took part in. Le Noir a captain in the regiment, was noted to be extremely brave in this battle in particular. He lost half of his men and was shot, and still managed to survive. The next battle La Sarre took part in was the decisive English victory at the Planes of Abraham. About 50 men were either injured or killed from the regiment during the battle. The final North American battle which the regiment would take part in was the Battle of Sainte-Foy. This was another victory for the French and La Sarre, which was inconsequential to the outcome of the war. The regiment lined up on the left flank of the French lines. There were signs of retreat on the left, but the regiment fought bravely and held off the English forces for half an hour until the rest of the French army came to its aid. Eventually, La Sarre with the help of the rest of the French army, managed to push the enemy off the battlefield.

After the Battle at Sainte-Foy, La Sarre took part in a halfhearted siege of Quebec City. On 16 May, the regiment was forced to lift the siege due to English reinforcements. In the months following the army was on a constant retreat, they could not fend off the British three pronged attack against Montréal. La Sarre took a few casualties along the way. A stray cannon shot took off a soldiers arm as well. The regiment was then charged to entrench themselves on Isle de Bourbon, but this was short-lived. Eventually the regiment met the same fate as the rest of the French presence in Canada. Regiment de la Sarre was placed on English boats returning to France. On 15 September the Regiment would leave Canada never to return. Of the 31 officers in the regiment 11 were killed and the rest were at some point injured. The Regiment would meet again in 1763 deployed in various European campaigns.

See also
 Military of New France

References

Military units and formations established in the 1650s
Military units and formations disestablished in 1791
Military units and formations of France in the French and Indian War
Line infantry regiments of the Ancien Régime